The 2018 BYU Cougars men's volleyball team represented Brigham Young University in the 2018 NCAA Division I & II men's volleyball season. The Cougars, led by third year head coach Shawn Olmstead, played their home games at Smith Fieldhouse. The Cougars were members of the MPSF and were picked to win the MPSF in the preseason poll.

Season highlights
Will be filled in as the season progresses.

Roster

Schedule
TV/Internet Streaming information:
TheW.tv will air select games when BYUtv has basketball commitments. 

 *-Indicates conference match.
 Times listed are Mountain Time Zone.

Announcers for televised games
Loyola-Chicago: Jarom Jordan, Steve Vail, Karch Kiraly, & Lauren McClain
Lewis: Robbie Bullough & Cosy Burnett
Ball State: Mick Tidrow & Alex Thomas
Ohio State: No commentary
Barton: Jarom Jordan, Steve Vail, & Lauren McClain
Barton: Jarom Jordan
UC Irvine: No commentary
UC Irvine: No commentary
UCSB: Jarom Jordan, Steve Vail, & Lauren McClain
UCSB: Jarom Jordan, Steve Vail, & Lauren McClain
UC San Diego: Tim Strombel & Ricci Luyties
USC: Paul Duchesne
Grand Canyon: Michael Potter & Taylor Griffin
Concordia Irvine: Jon O'Neill
Stanford: Kevin Barnett
Stanford: Jarom Jordan, Steve Vail, & Lauren McClain
Pepperdine: Robbie Bullough & Cosy Burnett
UCLA: Robbie Bullough & Amy Boswell
Hawai'i: Scott Robbs & Chris McLachlin
USC: Jarom Jordan, Steve Vail, & Lauren McClain
Concordia Irvine: Jarom Jordan, Steve Vail, & Lauren McClain
Grand Canyon: Jarom Jordan, Steve Vail, & Lauren McClain
Pepperdine: Al Epstein
UCLA: Kevin Barnett
USC: Jarom Jordan, Steve Vail, & Lauren McClain
UCLA: Jarom Jordan, Steve Vail, & Lauren McClain
UCLA: Lincoln Rose

References

2018 in sports in Utah
2018 NCAA Division I & II men's volleyball season
2018 team